Josefine Heinemann (born 7 January 1998) is a German chess player who holds the title of Woman Grandmaster (WGM, 2018).

Biography 
Josefine Heinemann first participation in a German Chess Championship is the U10 championship in 2007 in Willingen. In 2015 she won German Youth Chess Championship in Girls U18 age group. In the same year she ranked in 5th place in World Youth Chess Championship in Girls U18 age group. In 2016 she ranked in 10th place in this tournament.

In 2018 in Dresden Josefine Heinemann ranked 3rd in German Masters for women.

Josefine Heinemann played for Germany in the Women's Chess Olympiad:
 In 2022, at second board in the 44th Chess Olympiad (women) in Chennai (+2, =6, -1).

Josefine Heinemann played for Germany in the European Women's Team Chess Championships:
 In 2015, at reserve board in the 11th European Team Chess Championship (women) in Reykjavik (+4, =0, -3),
 In 2017, at second board in the 12th European Team Chess Championship (women) in Crete (+1, =1, -4),
 In 2021, at second board in the 14th European Team Chess Championship (women) in Čatež ob Savi (+4, =4, -1).

Josefine Heinemann played for Germany in the Women's Chess Mitropa Cups:
 In 2016, at reserve board in the 13th Chess Mitropa Cup (women) in Prague (+2, =3, -1) and won team gold medal,
 In 2017, at second board in the 14th Chess Mitropa Cup (women) in Balatonszárszó (+4, =1, -4).

In 2016, she was awarded the FIDE Woman International Master (WIM) title and received the FIDE Woman Grandmaster (WGM) title two years later.

Josefine Heinemann began studying business mathematics at the University of Mannheim and received a scholarship due to her sporting success.

References

External links 

 DWZ-Karteikarte von Josefine Heinemann in German Chess Federation
 Interview mit Josefine Heinemann im Schachgeflüster Podcast from 15 January 2022 from YouTube

1998 births
Living people
People from Gardelegen
Chess woman grandmasters
German female chess players